Kiliyer (Kilier) is a rural locality (a selo) in Kyachchinsky Rural Okrug of Olyokminsky District in the Sakha Republic, Russia, located  from Olyokminsk, the administrative center of the district and  from Kyachchi, the administrative center of the rural okrug. Its population as of the 2002 Census was 6.

References

Notes

Sources
Official website of the Sakha Republic. Registry of the Administrative-Territorial Divisions of the Sakha Republic. Olyokminsky District. 

Rural localities in Olyokminsky District